Thomas Myles Steinbeck (August 2, 1944 – August 11, 2016) was a screenwriter, photographer, and journalist. He published numerous works of fiction, including short stories and novels. He was the elder son of American novelist John Steinbeck.

Life and work

Early years
Thomas ("Thom") Steinbeck was born in Manhattan, New York City, to American novelist John Steinbeck and his second wife, singer-composer Gwyndolyn Conger on August 2, 1944. His younger brother John Steinbeck IV was born two years later. His parents' marriage dissolved four years after he was born, and subsequently Thom spent a great deal of time with his father, whom he credited for instilling in him not only a passion for the world's great writers, but also a recognition of how language and poetic rhythms affect individuals and society in general. He had a good relationship with his famous father, saying that he would rate him "an eight-and-a-half or a nine" on a ten-point scale.

Thom was educated at a number of East Coast boarding schools.  As he told an interviewer in 2011:

When not in school or on holiday, Thom and his brother traveled widely with their father to Europe, Greece, and North Africa. In 1961, the family spent a year traveling the world with a young teacher named Terrence McNally, whom the elder Steinbeck hired as a tutor for his sons. McNally later gained acclaim as a playwright and won four Tony Awards and an Emmy.

After high school, Thom Steinbeck studied animation at the California Institute of the Arts, then went on to study film at the UCLA School of Theater, Film and Television. The Vietnam War cut his studies short.

Military service
Steinbeck trained to serve with Armed Forces Radio and Television at Fort Knox, but arrived in Vietnam on the second day of the 1968 Tet Offensive and was immediately reassigned as a helicopter door gunner. Afterward, he resumed work as a combat photographer (he once said that "we had a fantasy that somehow we could take the photograph that could stop the war") and returned to his original posting with AFVN as a television production specialist. After his service, he returned to Vietnam, Laos, and Cambodia as a journalist and photographer.

Writer and filmmaker
Upon his return to the U.S., Steinbeck wrote and crewed on a number of documentaries, films and television projects. During the next 25 years, he wrote his own original screenplays and documentaries and screenplay adaptations of his father's work. The latter included screenplays based on In Dubious Battle, The Pearl, and Travels With Charley.

At age 58, Steinbeck published his first book, Down to a Soundless Sea (2002), a series of short stories based upon the original settlers of Big Sur, California, in the late 19th and early 20th centuries. The book was translated into seven languages, an audio version, and a large print edition, and was part of Oprah's Book Club. In 2010, Simon & Schuster published his first novel, In the Shadow of the Cypress. His second novel, The Silver Lotus, was released in November 2011 by Counterpoint Press.

Steinbeck contributed to the My California Project, a collection of short stories by 27 California authors. Sales from the book were used to help save the struggling California Arts Council. This book went into three printings, and the project helped the Council reach financial solvency.

Personal life
In addition to writing and producing, Steinbeck was an active public speaker and teacher, who often lectured on American literature, creative writing, and the communication arts. He served as a board member of both the National Steinbeck Center in Salinas, California and The Center for Steinbeck Studies at San Jose State University. Once every year, he personally presented the John Steinbeck Award through his foundation, The John Steinbeck Family Foundation in affiliation with The Center for Steinbeck Studies.

Steinbeck was an advocate for authors' rights. In 2009, he and his friend folk singer Arlo Guthrie brought a copyright infringement lawsuit against Google that was eventually settled.

At the time of his death, Steinbeck lived with his wife Gail in Santa Barbara, California. According to his family, he died of chronic obstructive pulmonary disease, nine days after his 72nd birthday.

Selected works
Fiction
Down to a Soundless Sea. (New York: Balantine Books, 2002)  (hardcover, 1st ed.) – 
In the Shadow of the Cypress (New York: Gallery Books, 2010)  (hardcover, 1st ed.) – 
The Silver Lotus (Berkeley, CA: Counterpoint, 2011)  (hardcover, 1st ed.) – 
Dr. Greenlaw and the Zulu Princess  (Post Hill Press, 2013) ASIN B00GS3V0SO (eBook edition only) – 
Cabbages and Kings  (Post Hill Press, 2013)  (eBook edition only) – 
Mrs. Penngelli and the Pirate (Post Hill Press, 2013)  (eBook edition only) – 
Contributor
Light, Melanie. Valley of Shadows and Dreams, with Ken Light (Photographer), Thomas Steinbeck (Foreword); (Berkeley, CA: Heyday Books, 2012) 
Kannard, Brian. Steinbeck: Citizen Spy, with Thomas Steinbeck (note to the Introduction); (Nashville, TN: Grave Distractions Publications, 2013) 
Brode, Benjamin. In Search of the Dark Watchers: Landscapes and Lore of Big Sur, with Thomas Steinbeck (Field Notes); (Steinbeck Press, 2014)

Further reading
 Benson, Jackson J (1990). John Steinbeck, Writer. Penguin Putnam Inc., second edition. 
 Steinbeck IV, John and Nancy Steinbeck (2001). The Other Side of Eden: Life with John Steinbeck. Prometheus Books.

References

External links
Author's website
Steinbeck Family Now Supports Google Book Plan

The accidental author: an essay by Thomas Steinbeck via Web Archive and the Wayback Machine
Common Ties: Thomas Steinbeck on Vietnam via Web Archive and the "Wayback machine"
 Down to a Soundless Sea at Oprah's Book Club
Steinbeck's Son Wins Rights to Dad's Work
MACV Biographies

1944 births
2016 deaths
Writers from Manhattan
People from Santa Barbara, California
John Steinbeck
United States Army personnel of the Vietnam War
United States Army soldiers
War photographers
Writers from California
Military personnel from New York City
20th-century American writers
21st-century American novelists
American male novelists
American short story writers
American male short story writers
Deaths from lung disease
Novelists from New York (state)
21st-century American male writers